Te Korowai o Wainuiārua is a grouping of Māori hapū in New Zealand.

See also
List of Māori iwi